The characteristic state function or Massieu's potential in statistical mechanics refers to a particular relationship between the partition function of an ensemble.

In particular, if the partition function P satisfies

 or 

in which Q is a thermodynamic quantity, then Q is known as the "characteristic state function" of the ensemble corresponding to "P". Beta refers to the thermodynamic beta.

Examples 
The canonical ensemble satisfies  hence, its characteristic state function is the Helmholtz free energy .
The grand canonical ensemble satisfies , so its characteristic state function is the Grand potential .
The isothermal-isobaric ensemble satisfies  so its characteristic function is the Gibbs free energy .

State functions are those which tell about the equilibrium state of a system

References 

Statistical mechanics